Granny Get Your Gun is a 1940 American comedy western film directed by George Amy and written by Kenneth Gamet. The film stars May Robson, Harry Davenport, Margot Stevenson, Hardie Albright, Clem Bevans and Clay Clement. It is based primarily on supporting characters found in the 1937 Perry Mason novel The Case of the Dangerous Dowager. The film was released by Warner Bros. on February 10, 1940.

Plot
Leonard Maltin: "Cute comic mystery... Robson is a hoot as a rough-riding Nevadan who straps on her six-shooters and turns sleuth to clear her granddaughter of a trumped-up murder charge."

Cast
May Robson as Minerva Hildegarde Hatton 
Harry Davenport as Nathaniel 'Nate' Paulson 
Margot Stevenson as Julie Westcott
Hardie Albright as Phillip 'Phil' Westcott
Clem Bevans as Smokey
Clay Clement as Riff Daggett
William B. Davidson as Fitzgerald 
Arthur Aylesworth as Sheriff Quinn
Granville Bates as Tom Redding
Ann E. Todd as Charlotte 
Vera Lewis as Carrie
Max Hoffman Jr. as Frayne
Archie Twitchell as Joe
Walter Wilson as Judge
Nat Carr as Wadsworth
Laird Cregar as Court Clerk (uncredited) 
Creighton Hale as Reporter (uncredited) 
Jack Mower as Bailiff (uncredited)

Reception
The film made a profit of $14,000.

References

External links

1940 films
Films directed by George Amy
American Western (genre) comedy films
1940s Western (genre) comedy films
Films based on American novels
Films based on mystery novels
Films set in Nevada
Perry Mason
Warner Bros. films
American black-and-white films
1940 comedy films
1940s American films
1940s English-language films